Rhydyclafdy (or Rhyd-y-clafdy) is a small village close to the southern coast of the Llŷn Peninsula in the Welsh county of Gwynedd. It lies 2.8 miles (4.58 km) to the west of Pwllheli and 19.65 miles (31.62 km) south west of Caernarfon. The village forms part of the community of Buan along with Boduan, and together they have a population of 469.

Education
Primary education was provided by Ysgol Rhydyclafdy, located in the village. The school is in the Ysgol Glan y Môr catchment area, where the majority of students will go on to complete their secondary education. However the school closed down in 2008 and village children have to travel to Llanbedrog or Pentre Uchaf.  This has had a marked effect on the  village community as the school was always the centre of the village.

Notable people 
Meic Parry, Sun Crazy Caravan Park's Events Manager and later B&B owner from the S4C hit program Talcen Caled's grandmother was from Rhydyclafdy. Many scenes make reference to 'Nain Rhydyclafdy' although she herself does not appear in the program.

References

Villages in Gwynedd
Buan, Gwynedd